"The Thrill Is Gone" is a slow minor-key blues song written by West Coast blues musician Roy Hawkins and Rick Darnell in 1951. Hawkins's recording of the song reached number six in the Billboard R&B chart in 1951.  In 1970, "The Thrill Is Gone" became a major hit for B.B. King. His rendition helped make the song a blues standard.

B.B. King rendition
B.B. King recorded his version of "The Thrill Is Gone" in June 1969 for his album Completely Well, released the same year. King's version is a slow 12-bar blues notated in the key of B minor in 4/4 time.  The song's polished production and use of strings marked a departure from both the original song and King's previous material.

When BluesWay Records released "The Thrill Is Gone" as a single in December 1969, it became one of the most successful of King's career and one of his signature songs. It reached number three in the Billboard Best Selling Soul Singles chart and number 15 in the broader Billboard Hot 100 chart.

B.B. King's recording earned him a Grammy Award for Best Male R&B Vocal Performance in 1970 and a Grammy Hall of Fame award in 1998.  King's version of the song was also placed at number 183 on Rolling Stone magazine's list of the 500 greatest songs of all time. Live versions of the song were included on King's albums Live in Cook County Jail (1971), Bobby Bland and B.B. King Together Again...Live (1976), and Live at San Quentin (1991).

References

1951 songs
1969 singles
1970 singles
ABC Records singles
Aretha Franklin songs
B.B. King songs
Blues songs
Grammy Hall of Fame Award recipients
Song recordings produced by Bill Szymczyk